Clobenztropine is an antihistamine.

References 

Chloroarenes
Ethers
H1 receptor antagonists
Tropanes